Syrian uprising may refer to:

 Great Syrian Revolt (1925–1927), the largest and longest-lasting anti-colonial insurgency in the inter-war Arab East
 Islamic uprising in Syria (1976–1982), a series of revolts and armed insurgency by Sunni Islamists
 Civil uprising phase of the Syrian civil war, part of the Syrian civil war (2011–present)